Robyn Porter (born July 1, 1966) is an American politician who has served in the Connecticut House of Representatives from the 94th district since 2014.

References

1966 births
Living people
Democratic Party members of the Connecticut House of Representatives
21st-century American politicians